Access journalism, or access reporting, refers to journalism (often in interview form) which prioritizes access—meaning media time with important, rich, famous, powerful or otherwise influential people in politics, culture, sports, and other areas—over journalistic objectivity and/or integrity.

Features
Typical features of access journalism include:
 absence of demanding accountability towards the questioned respondent
 avoiding controversial topics so as to maintain access to the respondent
 pre-approved questions, no gotcha questions, softball questions
 sometimes even respondent's control over how the interview will be edited and which parts will be aired

Access journalism, in some cases, is similar to infomercials, or advertising disguised as news. The venture of doing the interview can be symbiotic–beneficial for both the journalist and the celebrity, since it can synergically bring more attention to both of them, and further notability, influence, media exposure, current relevance, etc. for both of them.

Access journalism has been contrasted with accountability journalism. A similar contrast is between lapdog journalism and watchdog journalism.

Criticism
Critics of access journalism point out that trying to be friends with important figures for access betrays the original and fundamental role of journalism. The practice was mentioned tangentially in the Outfoxed documentary, which pointed out that the most recognized journalists of the flagship programs of the mainstream media, over the time, themselves become celebrities and occasionally mingle with other celebrities, including political ones, on cocktail parties, fancy dinners, banquets, etc. and create the kind of relationship that they, as journalists, should not have. One example of access journalism, in conjunction with gaining views and attention, was the attempt of the media to get access and media time with Donald Trump during the 2016 presidential cycle. His media attractiveness resulted in free media time, worth (according to estimates) between 2 and 5 billion USD. At the height of the run, some media outlets were calling Trump daily without specific issues to ask him about, just to get his voice on air and eyeballs of curious Americans in the process.

See also 
 Journalistic objectivity

References

Journalism
Criticism of journalism
Types of journalism
Journalism ethics